The National Locksmith, first published in 1929, is a magazine dedicated to the locksmithing industry by the National Publishing Co. of Streamwood.

References

External links
  

Business magazines published in the United States
Locksmithing
Magazines established in 1929
Magazines published in Illinois